Luca Turilli (also referred to as the Luca Turilli Band) was the self-named German symphonic power metal musical project of Italian musician  Luca Turilli, originally assembled in 1999.

History
The band was founded by Luca Turilli, guitarist of Rhapsody (now called Rhapsody of Fire), with the intention of combining the typical sound of orchestral and symphonic metal with modern arrangements and the frequent use of synthesizers. Turilli had the goal of making a trilogy by creating a first album based on the past, one on the future, and a third on the present time. From a lyrical point of view, the three albums were connected by the typical positive and deeply spiritual message of Turilli praising the miracle of life and creation.

Rhapsody's then-producers, Sascha Paeth and Miro, were hired to do the same job and also to provide bass and additional keyboard duties, respectively (Luca composed the keyboard parts for the album but preferred to have a proper keyboardist on stage). Robert Hunecke-Rizzo, who had helped Rhapsody out as a session musician in the past, was hired as the drummer, and Olaf Hayer, an established German vocalist completed the band.

On the second album, Luca performed lead guitar and part of the keyboards, with Robert Hunecke-Rizzo also performing rhythm parts. For the third album, Luca performed all keyboards himself and Miro was not utilised. On the album, Bridget Fogle, a choir vocalist who had previously worked with Rhapsody and various other metal bands, was used as a co-lead vocalist with Olaf Hayer.

With the release of the third and final album of the trilogy, the band's activity was concluded as planned from the beginning.

Members

Last line-up
 Olaf Hayer – male lead vocals (1999–2011)
 Luca Turilli – guitars (1999–2011), keyboards (2005–2011)
 Sascha Paeth – bass (1999–2011)
 Robert Hunecke-Rizzo – drums (1999–2011)

Past members
 Miro – keyboards (1999–2005)
 Bridget Fogle – female lead vocals (2005–2007)

Timeline

Discography

Albums 
King of the Nordic Twilight (1999)
Prophet of the Last Eclipse (2002)
The Infinite Wonders of Creation (2006)

Singles 
"The Ancient Forest of Elves" (1999)
"Demonheart" (2002)

Cover songs
 "I'm Alive", by Helloween

See also
 Luca Turilli
 Luca Turilli's Dreamquest
 Rhapsody of Fire

External links
 Luca Turilli's official website
 Luca Turilli at Magic Circle Music

Musical groups established in 1999
Italian power metal musical groups
Musical quartets
1999 establishments in Germany